Yok Mu-ming (born 19 July 1940) is a Taiwanese politician and was the chairperson of the New Party from 2003 to February 2020.

Cross-strait relations

2005 Mainland China visit
Yok and delegates from the New Party made an 8-day visit to Mainland China in July 2005 to commemorate the 60th anniversary of China's victory in the Second Sino-Japanese War. The delegates visited Beijing, Dalian, Guangzhou and Nanjing in a tour called "Journey of the Chinese Nation".

In Guangzhou, Yok and his delegates paid tribute at the Huanghuagang Mausoleum of 72 Martyrs honoring the deceased during the Second Guangzhou Uprising to overthrow the Qing Dynasty and establish the Republic of China.

2010 Mainland China visit
In May 2010, Yok visited the National Museum of China in Beijing in which he met with the museum director Lu Zhangshen. Lu briefed Yok about the current situation of the museum renovation. He also expressed hope for future collaboration between the museum and Taiwan, as well as strengthening ties with various cultural organizations in Taiwan.

2012 Tiaoyutai Islands dispute
In 2012, responding to the dispute of Tiaoyutai Islands between Taiwan, Mainland China and Japan, Yok published a written statement saying that trilateral negotiation between the three sides cannot be realized at the current time, Taiwan should hold a dialogue with Mainland China so that the two sides could jointly discuss issues related to defending the islands.

2014 Mainland China visit
During his visit to China in end of September 2014 to meet with the President of the People's Republic of China and General Secretary of the Chinese Communist Party (CCP) Xi Jinping, Yok attended Xi's speech on peaceful unification and one country, two systems in resolving Taiwan issues and how Beijing would not tolerate a Taiwan independence movement. The statement marked the first time Xi Jinping spoke of one country, two systems as a reunification model for Taiwan before Taiwanese politicians since he became General Secretary of the CCP on 15 November 2012.

2016 Mainland China visit
Yok attended the 150th anniversary of the birthday of Sun Yat-sen event in Beijing in November 2016 led by General Secretary Xi Jinping.

References

New Party Members of the Legislative Yuan
Living people
1940 births
Chinese nationalists
Taiwanese people from Shanghai
Kuomintang Members of the Legislative Yuan in Taiwan
Members of the 1st Legislative Yuan in Taiwan
Members of the 2nd Legislative Yuan
Members of the 3rd Legislative Yuan
Taipei Members of the Legislative Yuan
Taoyuan City Members of the Legislative Yuan
Republic of China politicians from Shanghai
Taiwanese political party founders
Leaders of the New Party (Taiwan)